Eastacombe is a hamlet in Tawstock parish, Devon, England, about  southwest of Barnstaple. The hamlet of St John's Chapel is close by, to the west.

References

Hamlets in Devon
North Devon